On 27 April 2013, the national public holiday of Freedom Day in South Africa which some grassroots social movements have termed UnFreedom Day, members of Abahlali baseMjondolo occupied a piece of land in Philippi, Cape Town. They named the occupation Marikana after the Marikana miners' strike. The occupation was repeatedly destroyed by the city's anti-land invasion unit. According to the Daily Maverick the occupiers were evicted on six separate occasions. Two months after the eviction 90 people were still sleeping on the site under a tent.

Cindy Ketani was quoted in Red Pepper as saying that "When they come to destroy these shacks, they show us no court orders or papers. They just pull these people out like dogs".

Unlawful Evictions

Abahlali baseMjondolo alleged that the evictions were violent, that their members' property was broken and stolen and that they were also unlawful as the City did not have a court order.<ref>Cops in shack clash , Mandla Manyaka, The New Age, 30 April 2013</ref> This view was later endorsed by legal experts and an article in the Daily Maverick'' suggested that the City of Cape Town was making reference to a fictitious law to justify the evictions and, also, lying about the fact that the shacks had all been unoccupied before they were demolished. Constitutional law expert Pierre de Vos later wrote that these evictions were "Brutal, inhumane, and totally unlawful".

Ownership of the Land

The land that was occupied is part of a larger parcel of 200h of land bought by NTWA Dumela Investments in 2007.

Online News Reports
 Shack dwellers ready to die for 'Marikana' land in Cape Town, ENCA, 2013 (Television)
 Paramilitary 'anti-land invasion units' celebrate South Africa's UnFreedom Day by destroying Marikana Township, KPFA.94, 2013 (Radio)
 City shows zero tolerance for 'Marikana' settlement,  ENCA, 2014 (Television)

Additional video
 Marikana Land Occupation, Pablo Pinedo Boveda, 1 May 2013.

See also
 Marikana Land Occupation (Durban)
 Abahlali baseMjondolo

Notes and references

Cape Town
Protests in South Africa
Land occupations in South Africa
Protests inspired by the 2012 Marikana miners' strike
Squats in South Africa